The Moon Looked On is the third studio album by Australian indie band, Clare Bowditch and the Feeding Set. It was released on 13 October 2007 via Capitol/EMI. It debuted and peaked at No. 29 on the ARIA Albums Chart. It was produced by Marty Brown, the group's drummer and Bowditch's husband.

A limited edition 2× CD version was also released in 2007, the second disc, The Moon Looked On 2 – Campfire Versions, had all 12 tracks re-recorded by Bowditch as a solo artist.

At the ARIA Music Awards of 2008, the album was nominated for ARIA Award for Best Adult Contemporary Album while Bowditch was nominated for ARIA Award for Best Female Artist.

Reception

Track listing 
 "You Look So Good" - 4:08
 "Peccadilloes" - 4:48
 "Between the Tea and the Toast" - 3:42
 "I Am Not Allowed" - 3:53
 "When the Lights Went Down" - 3:22
 "Little Black Cave" - 3:19
 "This Bastard Disease" - 2:40
 "I Love the Way You Talk" - 3:16
 "That Wouldn't Be So Good" - 4:30
 "Your Other Hand" - 3:40
 "You Can Stay the Night" - 4:07
 "People Like Me, People Like You" - 7:18

 Bonus Disc Campfire Versions (Clare Bowditch Solo)
 "Peccadilloes" 
 "Between the Tea and the Toast"
 "I Am Not Allowed" (featuring Mick Turner on guitar)
 "When the Lights Went Down" 
 "Little Black Cave" 
 "This Bastard Disease" 
 "I Love the Way You Talk" 
 "That Wouldn't Be So Good"
 "Your Other Hand" 
 "You Can Stay the Night" 
 "People Like Me, People Like You"

Chaats

Release history

References 

Clare Bowditch and the Feeding Set albums
2007 albums